The Reporter, also known as The Ethiopian Reporter, is a private newspaper published in Addis Ababa, Ethiopia. It appears in both English and Amharic, and is owned by the Media and Communications Center. The general manager and founder of the newspaper is Amare Aregawi.

History 
The Reporter was founded in 1995 by the Media and Communications Center. As of 2010, its editor and owner was Amare Aregawi.

Products 
 Print newspaper
 Website
 Mobile
 English version
 Amharic version

Staff 
Yacob Wolde-Mariam, a renowned journalist, has been a senior editor with the newspaper since its inception. Yibekal Getahun is the senior graphic designer of the newspaper.

Controversies 
On 22 August 2008, police arrested the editor of The Reporter, Amare Aregawi, in Gondar, in connection with an article that criticised Dashen Brewery's, a local beer brand, labour practices. He was held in custody for six days after a defamation lawsuit was filed against the newspaper by the brewery in a Gondar court.

References 

1995 establishments in Ethiopia
Amharic-language newspapers
English-language newspapers published in Africa
Mass media in Addis Ababa
Newspapers established in 1995
Weekly newspapers published in Ethiopia